Avitoluvarus ("Ancient Louvar") is a genus of extinct louvar that lived in the Tethys Ocean during the early Paleogene.  The first specimens were found from the Danata Formation Lagerstätten, of the Thanetian age of Turkmenistan, where they were originally thought to be smaller or juvenile individuals of the true louvar, Luvarus necopinatus.  These specimens were later reexamined, and determined to be a separate genus comprising two species.

A third species, A. eocaenicus is known from the Middle Eocene of the Kumsky Horizon, in what is now the Northern Caucasus Mountains in Southwestern Russia.

Avitoluvarus differs from modern louvars in that the former's forehead does not bulge out as much, giving the appearance of having the face appear higher.

References

Luvaridae
Eocene genus extinctions
Paleogene fish of Asia
Prehistoric ray-finned fish genera